"The 'In' Crowd" is a 1964 song written by Billy Page and arranged by his brother Gene and originally performed by Dobie Gray on his album Dobie Gray Sings for "In" Crowders That Go "Go-Go".  It appeared on an episode of Dick Clark's Rock, Roll & Remember, featuring in the last week of November 1964, the month Gray's rendition was released.

Chart performance
In the US, Gray's powerful Motown-like version, complete with brass section, reached number 11 on the Hot Rhythm & Blues Singles chart and number 13 on the Billboard Hot 100 on 20 February 1965. Outside the US, "The 'In' Crowd" went to number 25 on the UK Singles Chart, and number 8 in Canada.  Gray's Shindig! performance of the song aired on 10 March 1965.

Ramsey Lewis's instrumental version
The Ramsey Lewis Trio recorded an instrumental version of the tune later in 1965. Their jazzy take, recorded live at Bohemian Caverns, a Washington, D.C., night club, was released in June 1965 and reached number 5 on the Hot 100 on 9 October 1965, as well as peaking at number 2 for three weeks on the Hot Rhythm & Blues Singles chart. In Canada, the record reached number 6 in the RPM charts. An album of the live recording used the song's name.

Other versions
 Bryan Ferry on his 1974 album Another Time, Another Place; also released as a single, reaching number 13 on the UK Singles Chart.

References

External links
 

1965 singles
Ramsey Lewis songs
Dobie Gray songs
Bryan Ferry songs
1964 songs
1974 singles
Argo Records singles